Orecchiette alla materana is a typical dish of Matera, Basilicata. It is made with fresh orecchiette pasta, tomatoes, lamb, mozzarella, Pecorino cheese, extra virgin olive oil and salt. 

Casserole dishes
Cuisine of Basilicata
Italian cuisine
Pasta dishes
Lamb dishes